Wipi, also known as Gidra, Jibu or Oriomo, is a Papuan language of New Guinea. It is a member of the Eastern Trans-Fly family, the other languages of this family being Gizrra, Meriam Mir and Bine. The family has influenced the neighbouring Kiwai language as well as Kalau Lagau Ya.

Distribution 
Wipi is spoken in fourteen main villages, with the Wipim village as the centre. Wipi speakers occupy a broad swathe of inland territory in the eastern plains between the Fly River and the Torres Strait, specifically around the Oriomo River and Binaturi River.

Phonology 
Phonology of the Wipi language:

Consonants

Vowels

References

Eastern Trans-Fly languages
Languages of Western Province (Papua New Guinea)